David Jackman is a British musician and visual artist with an extensive catalogue of drone works, mostly as the principal — and often sole — member of Organum.

Jackman's earliest known musical activity was as a member of Cornelius Cardew's Scratch Orchestra between 1969 and 1972. He later spoke highly of the value of his experiences in the ensemble, writing in 1994 that "I joined the orchestra in 1969 and soon found myself thrown into an energetic environment where to my surprise my musical ideas, however tentative, would be taken seriously and would actually get realised". In 1979 he began to release very short runs of cassette singles, in line with the prevailing underground cassette culture. These were almost all released under his given name or the moniker Monoplane. It was not until 1983 that he began to use the name Organum and release his work on vinyl on various labels around Europe as well as his own imprint, Aeroplane.  Many of his releases are short; he has released several one sided 7" singles and many EPs. In an interview with US magazine ND (issue 20, 1995), he declared "I don't enjoy lengthy programmes. A 70 minute CD is similar to the old double album. And I never did like that".

Live performances by Jackman have been very rare and he consents to very few interviews. Despite this relative seclusion, Organum has been a platform for many collaborations with contributors including Steven Stapleton of Nurse With Wound, Christoph Heemann, Robert Hampson, Jim O'Rourke, Michael Prime of Morphogenesis, Eddie Prévost of AMM, Andrew Chalk and noise artists The New Blockaders. He also made a single, "Breakthrough" for The Haters without the intervention or collaboration of their principal member, GX Jupitter-Larsen; Jackman's website reports that Larsen said of the single that "my music has never sounded better". Prévost, Stapleton and Heemann all released Organum albums on their respective labels with other releases appearing on Touch Records, Robot Records and German label Die Stadt. More recently, he guested with AMM and made several collaborative releases with percussionist Z'EV, all credited jointly to Z'EV and Organum.

He is also known for the distinctive artwork which adorns his releases, mostly surreal colourful collages, often meticulous in their detail. However, he has also released some recordings in deliberately spartan or even non-existent artwork - one CD release came in a clear jewel case with no paper parts or other packaging. The official website archives nearly all of this artwork.

Jackman continues to create new works as well as reissuing earlier, long-unavailable titles.

References

External links
 Official website with full discography

British experimental musicians
Living people
Year of birth missing (living people)
Cassette culture 1970s–1990s